Fallbrook is a CDP in northern San Diego County, California. Fallbrook had a population of 30,534 at the 2010 census, up from 29,100 at the 2000 census.  

Fallbrook's downtown is not on a major highway route. Fallbrook is immediately east of the U.S. Marine Corps' Camp Pendleton.  

Fallbrook is known for its avocado groves and claims, without any official recognition, the title "Avocado Capital of the World".

History
The community of Fallbrook was first settled by the Payomkawichum people, later called Luiseños by the Spanish missionaries who were present in the area in the late 1700s. Large village sites and oak groves were established by the Luiseños. One site in particular became the area known today as Live Oak County Park.

The first permanent recorded settlement was during the Mexican period in 1846, when Ysidro Alvarado was granted Rancho Monserate by then governor of Mexican California, Pio Pico, who was residing to the west of Fallbrook where Camp Pendleton is currently located. Alvarado and Pico were second-generation Californians and San Diegans and were citizens of Mexico and the United States.

Rancho Monserate, a 13,323-acre grant stretched from the San Luis Rey River and Bonsall to the south to Stagecoach Lane and the Palomares house to the North to Mission Road to the west to Monserate Mountain to the east.

Pio's nephew and local vaquero, Jose Maria Pico, had been residing in the area now known as the Fallbrook High School during the 1860 census and his family had registered to vote in October 1868, in time for the November presidential election, the first election after the Civil War ended.

The first known image of the area was an oil painting done by James Walker in 1870 called Roping the Bear at Santa Margarita Rancho, which depicts Mexican vaqueros capturing a grizzly bear.

Later, Canadian immigrant Vital Reche settled here with his family just north of Alvarado's ranch at the site now known as Live Oak Park. They named the new community Fall Brook after their former homestead in Pennsylvania.

Oak trees were the original primary trees in Fallbrook. Furthermore, olives became a major crop by the 1920s and continued through World War II, but were eventually phased out in favor of the present avocado and floral industry.  

Incorporation votes occurred in 1981 and 1987, but both votes failed.

Climate and vegetation

Fallbrook has an average year-round temperature of 64 degrees. Due to the prevailing ocean breezes, the humidity is relatively low and constant.

The average daytime high in Fallbrook is 76 degrees, although in the summer, temperatures sometimes exceed 90 degrees. Most of the area is frost-free; during the coldest periods the average nighttime temperature is about 43 degrees. Due to its proximity to the ocean, days often start with early morning fog; afternoons can be breezy.

The area is ideal for avocados, strawberries, tomatoes and many other sub-tropical fruits, vegetables, and flowers.

Native evergreen oak trees are common in the Fallbrook area, and in places form continuous woods (e.g. Live Oak Park area). Chaparral brushland is the other common vegetation type in the area. Avocados and Eucalyptus are the most common introduced tree species in the area.

Geography
Fallbrook stands at elevations between 500 and 1500 feet, with an average around 685 feet.

Demographics

2010
The 2010 United States Census reported that Fallbrook had a population of 30,534. The racial makeup of Fallbrook was 20,454 (67.0%) White with 49.1% of the population being non-Hispanic whites, 489 (1.6%) African American, 233 (0.8%) Native American, 592 (1.9%) Asian, 71 (0.2%) Pacific Islander, 7,372 (24.1%) from other races, and 1,323 (4.3%) from two or more races. Hispanic or Latino of any race were 13,800 persons (45.2%).

The Census reported that 30,383 people (99.5% of the population) lived in households, 94 (0.3%) lived in non-institutionalized group quarters, and 57 (0.2%) were institutionalized.

There were 9,999 households, out of which 3,929 (39.3%) had children under the age of 18 living in them, 5,953 (59.5%) were opposite-sex married couples living together, 1,140 (11.4%) had a female householder with no husband present, 577 (5.8%) had a male householder with no wife present. There were 528 (5.3%) unmarried opposite-sex partnerships, and 45 (0.5%) same-sex married couples or partnerships. 1,782 households (17.8%) were made up of individuals, and 870 (8.7%) had someone living alone who was 65 years of age or older. The average household size was 3.04. There were 7,670 families (76.7% of all households); the average family size was 3.40.

The age distribution indicated 8,045 people (26.3%) under the age of 18, 3,768 people (12.3%) aged 18 to 24, 7,022 people (23.0%) aged 25 to 44, 7,457 people (24.4%) aged 45 to 64, and 4,242 people (13.9%) who were 65 years of age or older. The median age was 34.7 years. For every 100 females, there were 99.5 males. For every 100 females age 18 and over, there were 98.3 males.

The homeowner vacancy rate was 2.4%; the rental vacancy rate was 8.5%. 17,274 people (56.6% of the population) lived in owner-occupied housing units and 13,109 people (42.9%) lived in rental housing units.

2000
As of the census of 2000, there were 29,100 people, 9,367 households, and 7,343 families residing in the CDP. The population density was 1,663.3 inhabitants per square mile (642.0/km2). The racial makeup of the CDP was 71.78% White, 1.43% African American, 0.90% Native American, 1.54% Asian, 0.30% Pacific Islander, 20.16% from other races, and 3.89% from two or more races. Hispanic or Latino of any race were 37.30% of the population.

There were 9,367 households, out of which 39.5% had children under the age of 18 living with them, 63.3% were married couples living together, 10.2% had a female householder with no husband present, and 21.6% were non-families. 16.8% of all households were made up of individuals, and 8.4% had someone living alone who was 65 years of age or older.

The median income for a household in the CDP was $43,778, and the median income for a family was $48,157. Males had a median income of $31,615 versus $27,116 for females. The per capita income for the CDP was $18,152. About 10.7% of families and 14.7% of the population were below the poverty line, including 20.3% of those under age 18 and 8.1% of those age 65 or over.

Government

2007 wildfires
On October 21, 2007, wildfires broke out across San Diego county and other parts of Southern California. By October 23, the Rice Canyon Fire had crossed Interstate 15 and spread into the east area of Fallbrook along Reche Road, prompting a mandatory evacuation order for all residents. As of October 23, 206 homes, two commercial properties, and forty outbuildings had burned. These figures include over one hundred homes that burned in the Valley Oaks Mobile Home Park and Pala Mesa Village condos.

Schools

 Fallbrook Union High School
 Fallbrook Elementary School District
 Bonsall Unified School District

Religion
Fallbrook offers many places of worship, including:

 North Coast Church Fallbrook
 Christ the King Lutheran Church
 Fallbrook United Methodist Church
 Cornerstone Baptist Church
 Christ Church Fallbrook
 SonRise Christian Fellowship
 Inland Hills Community Church
 LifePointe Fallbrook
 First Christian Church
 St. John's Episcopal Church
 Calvary Chapel Fallbrook
 Fallbrook Spanish Seventh-day Adventist Church
 Grace Fallbrook (PCA)
 Fallbrook Church of Christ
 Fallbrook Assembly of God Church
 Hilltop Spiritual Center
 St. Peter the Apostle Parish
 Emmanuel Baptist Church
 St. Stephen Lutheran Church
 The Light of the World Church 
 Living Water Christian Fellowship
 Zion Lutheran Church
 The Church of Jesus Christ of Latter-Day Saints

Notable people
Fallbrook is a center for the arts with longtime residents fostering a creative atmosphere and newcomers bringing additional talents to the area. In the 1940s and 1950s it was the home of film director Frank Capra, who raised olives on his Red Mountain Ranch. He served on the Board of the local water district and produced a short subject film about a water rights controversy with the federal government titled "The Fallbrook Story." In the mid-2000s, Fallbrook gained popularity among Hollywood celebrities. Among those with primary or secondary residences in Fallbrook:

 James Callahan, actor
 Frank Capra, director
 Richard Carpenter of The Carpenters
 Rita Coolidge, singer
 Michael Curtis, television writer and producer (Friends, JONAS)
 Edward Faulkner
 Rick Founds, Christian songwriter, best known for writing "Lord I Lift Your Name On High".
 Tony Hawk (former resident)
 Leo Howard, actor
 Howard Keel, Fallbrook Union High School alumnus
 Tom Metzger, white supremacist and former Ku Klux Klan leader (former resident)
 Martin Milner (former resident)
 Jason Mraz, musician
 Dave Mustaine, musician (secondary residence)
 T. Jefferson Parker
 Shane Peterson (former resident)
 Christie Repasy, floral artist
 Mark Rogowski (former resident)
 Tom Selleck, actor
 Duke Snider
 Elise Trouw, musician (former resident)
Dolores Costello, actress

See also

 List of census-designated places in California

References

External links

 Fallbrook-Bonsall Village News
 Fallbrook Chamber of Commerce

Census-designated places in San Diego County, California
North County (San Diego County)
Populated places established in 1869
1869 establishments in California
Census-designated places in California